= Mbaye Gana Kébé =

Senegalese writer

M'baye Gana Kébé (Thiès, 1936 - Dakar, 11 April 2013) was a Senegalese French language writer.

He studied at the upper normal school and was a literature teacher.

== Works ==
- Ébéniques, 1975
- Le Blanc du nègre, 1979
- Colombes, 1979
- Ronde, 1979
- Le Décret, 1984
- Les lèvres bleues, 1984
- Le cri de notre sang, 1994
- Soldats de mes rêves, 1997
- Gorgui, 2003
- Tirailleurs en France, 2005
- Capitaine N'Tchoréré, 2008
- Une fresque pour Thiaroye, 2008
